Detter is a surname. Notable people with the surname include:

Brian Detter (born 1959), American business executive and U.S. Navy official
Dag Detter (born 1959), Swedish investment advisor, author, and speaker
Justin Detter (born 1982), American soccer player